Crosby Farm is a regional park in Saint Paul, Minnesota, United States, that is located in the floodplain forests along the Mississippi River. It is named after a historic farmstead owned by Thomas Crosby from 1858 to 1886. Crosby Farm Regional Park is maintained by the City of Saint Paul and is within the Mississippi National River and Recreation Area.

History
Thomas Crosby acquired the original,  farm in 1858 at the West End/Highland Park area of Saint Paul, and farmed it until his death in 1886. The farm was owned by a succession of other families over the proceeding decades. In the 1960s, the Saint Paul Port Authority acquired the land and leased it as parkland to the City of Saint Paul.

Regional park 
The , contiguous Hidden Falls and Crosby Farm regional parks are the largest natural park in Saint Paul. Crosby Farm park protects the floodplain forest along the north bank of the Mississippi River corridor, the dense oak forest adjacent the steep river bluff, and several wetlands and small lakes, including Crosby Lake and Upper Lake.

Recreation
Crosby Farm Regional Park includes  of paved trails for hiking and cycling that to the south connect it to the Watergate Marina and Hidden Falls Regional Park. Popular activities include picnicking, hiking, boating, fishing, cycling, and cross country skiing.

See also 
 History of Saint Paul, Minnesota
 Upper Mississippi River

References

External links
Crosby Farm Regional Park map
Minnesota Department of Natural Resources: Crosby Lake
Mississippi National River and Recreation Area

Parks in Saint Paul, Minnesota
Hiking trails in Minnesota
Mississippi National River and Recreation Area
Protected areas of Ramsey County, Minnesota
Parks in Minnesota